The 1969 World Table Tennis Championships men's singles was the 30th edition of the men's singles championship. 

Shigeo Itoh defeated Eberhard Schöler in the final, winning three sets to two to secure the title.

Results

See also
List of World Table Tennis Championships medalists

References

-